Guilherme Patroni (born 11 June 1929) is a Portuguese former swimmer. He competed in the men's 100 metre freestyle at the 1952 Summer Olympics.

References

External links
 

1929 births
Possibly living people
Olympic swimmers of Portugal
Swimmers at the 1952 Summer Olympics
People from Seixal
Portuguese male freestyle swimmers
Sportspeople from Setúbal District